Carminatia tenuiflora  (plumeweed) is a species of annual plants in the family Asteraceae. It is native primarily to Mexico, but also the southwestern United States and Central America.

Description
These plants have erect stems which are unbranched or have few branches and grow 10 centimeters (4 inches) to well over 100 centimeters (40 inches) in height. The leaves are mostly opposite, but on the upper stem they may be alternately arranged. The cylindrical flower heads are just a few millimeters wide and are arranged in narrow or spikelike inflorescences. They contain 8 to 12 greenish or whitish disc florets. The fruit is a cypsela with a pappus of several plumelike bristles or scales.

Carminatia tenuiflora is found in Guatemala, El Salvador, most of Mexico, southern Arizona, southwestern New Mexico, western Texas

References 

SEINet, Southwestern Biodiversity, Arizona Chapter, Carminatia tenuiflora DC. includes photo and partial distribution map
Calphotos photo gallery, University of California
photo of herbarium specimen collected in Nuevo León

Eupatorieae
Plants described in 1838
Flora of the Southwestern United States
Flora of Mexico
Flora of Central America